Christine Barrett Whelan (born July 5, 1977) is a writer, journalist, and commentator. She is the author of two books about marriage, and two self-help books for young-adults. She is a clinical professor at the University of Wisconsin-Madison.

Early life

Whelan was born in New York City to attorney Stephen T. Whelan and Elizabeth M. Whelan, an author and public health specialist.

At eight years old, Whelan was the moderator for "No Kidding," a nationally syndicated health talk show for kids, by kids, produced by the American Council on Science and Health, the organization her mother founded.

Education

Whelan earned her undergraduate degree from Princeton University, graduating magna cum laude with a degree in Politics. Whelan subsequently was awarded the 1999 Daniel M. Sachs scholarship, one of Princeton's highest honors, which enabled her to study at Worcester College, Oxford. As a Sachs Scholar, she studied Economic and Social History at the University of Oxford, from which she earned her masters and doctorate.

Academic and consulting roles 
Whelan has held teaching positions in the Sociology department at the University of Iowa and in the Sociology and Politics departments at Princeton University. In 2009 she accepted a position with the Sociology department at the University of Pittsburgh, where she taught until 2013. In 2013, she accepted a position with the Consumer Science department at the School of Human Ecology at University of Wisconsin-Madison, where she currently teaches and directs the Money, Relationships, and Equality (MORE).

Journalism

As an undergraduate, Whelan was editor-in-chief of The Daily Princetonian. From 1997 through 2000, she interned at The Wall Street Journal in New York and Washington bureaus and in 2000 interned at The Washington Post. In 2008, Whelan was awarded a Templeton-Cambridge Journalism Fellowship.

Whelan's writing has appeared in The Wall Street Journal, The New York Times, USA Today, National Review Online and The Washington Post, among other publications. From 2005-2010, she wrote a bi-weekly relationship advice column for Busted Halo and contributed occasional pieces to The Huffington Post.

Publishing

Whelan's first book, Why Smart Men Marry Smart Women, was published by Simon & Schuster in October 2006. In the book, Whelan coined the term SWANS, which stands for Strong Women Achievers, No Spouse.

Intended in part as a response to Maureen Dowd's 2005 book Are Men Necessary? When Sexes Collide, Whelan presented evidence contrary to the belief that an elite education and high income among women correlate with lower marriage rates. Using Census Bureau statistics, a commissioned poll of 3,700 men and women ages 25 to 40 and personal interviews, Whelan showed that while the stereotype was valid among previous generations, today a higher income and education in fact increases a woman's marriage chances, and that high-achieving women simply marry later in life.

Prior to conducting the research, Whelan originally intended for the book to be a pessimistic take on the marriage prospects of professional women, drawn from popular studies and personal experience. The book was initially conceived with the title Overqualified for Love.

Whelan's second book, Marry Smart: The Intelligent Woman's Guide to True Love, was published by Simon & Schuster on December 30, 2008. Whelan's third book, Generation WTF: From “What the #%$&” to a Wise, Tenacious, and Fearless You, was published by Templeton Press in February 2011. Whelan's fourth book, The Big Picture: A Guide to Finding Your Purpose in Life, was published in May 2016.

Public appearances

Whelan has frequently appeared as an expert commentator on television news programs, including The NewsHour with Jim Lehrer, Good Morning America, and on national radio programs, including Iowa Public Radio, Wisconsin Public Radio, and the BBC  Whelan is a frequent featured speaker at public events and academic conferences.

Personal

Whelan has three young children.

References

External links
Whelan official website
Whelan at University of Iowa website
Whelan at Simon & Schuster website
Huffington Post archive
Busted Halo archive
Whelan at University of Wisconsin-Madison

1977 births
Living people
American bloggers
Princeton University alumni
Alumni of Worcester College, Oxford
Writers from New York City
University of Pittsburgh faculty